29 Pashons - Coptic calendar - 1 Paoni

Fixed commemorations
All fixed commemorations below are observed on 30 Pashons (7 June) by the Coptic Orthodox Church.

Saints
Saint Fortunatus, one of the seventy Apostles
Pope Michael IV of Alexandria (818 A.M.), (1102 A.D.)

References
Coptic Synexarion

Days of the Coptic calendar